The Nokia 6210 is a mobile phone made by Nokia. It was introduced at the CeBIT fair in Hanover in February 2000, succeeding the Nokia 6110. In addition to calling and SMS messaging, it has many other features, including an alarm clock, HSCSD modem, WAP web client, three games (Snake 2, Pairs II and Opposite), calculator, to-do list application, calendar, infrared connectivity, voice recorder, and stopwatch. The plastic detail below the keypad, which Nokia called the Personal Badge, is removable; for a time, Nokia sent free promotional replacements, screen-printed with text of the customer's choosing. 

The 6210 could have Bluetooth functionality added via the Nokia Connectivity Pack, which included a replacement battery incorporating a Bluetooth adaptor and antenna, interfacing with the phone via normally unused electrical contacts in the battery compartment and a connectivity card with a PCMCIA adaptor, for Bluetooth connections to a portable computer. In December 2000, Bluetooth was not yet widespread. Connectivity batteries were available separately. A software upgrade was required for existing 6210 owners. In this way, upgraded 6210s were the earliest cellular phones with Bluetooth connectivity. The upgrade pack was ready several months before the launch of the first phones with built-in Bluetooth, but was not released until sometime after that launch.

Popular culture
Speaking in 2014, human-rights activist and former punk rock star Bob Geldof said that he still used a Nokia 6210, 14 years after its release. Citing its robust nature, he referred to it as “the AK-47 of mobile phones.”

See also
List of Nokia products
Nokia 6210 Navigator

References

External links
 
 User Guide (PDF) Archived in multiple Languages at archive.org

6210
Mobile phones with infrared transmitter
Mobile phones introduced in 2000